The 2013 USA Indoor Track and Field Championships was held at Albuquerque Convention Center in Albuquerque, New Mexico. Organised by USA Track and Field (USATF), the three-day competition took place March 1–3 in conjunction with the USA Indoor Combined Events Championships which started the day after and served as the national championships in track and field for the United States.

Medal summary

Men

Women

References

Results
2013 USA Indoor Track and Field Championships Results . USA Track and Field. Retrieved on 2018-02-15.

External links
Official USATF website

2013
Track and field indoor
USA Indoor Track and Field Championships
Sports in Albuquerque, New Mexico
Sports competitions in New Mexico
2013 in sports in New Mexico
Track and field in New Mexico
Events in Albuquerque, New Mexico